Avice is a feminine given name and a surname. It may refer to:

People:
 Avice Maud Bowbyes (1901–1992), New Zealand writer
 Avice Conway, 17th century heiress and wife of Robert Blennerhassett (MP for Tralee)
 Amicia/Avice Fitz-Hugh, wife of Robert Marmion (married c. 1215)
 Avice Landone (1910–1976), British actress
 Avice Stafford (1423–1457), first wife of James Butler, 5th Earl of Ormond
 Avice, 18th century pastry chef credited with inventing choux buns – see Choux pastry
 Claude Avice (1925–1995), French science fiction writer whose main pen name was Pierre Barbet
 Edwige Avice (born 1945), French politician
 Jean Avice, 19th century pastry chef credited by some with inventing the Madeleine cake

Fictional characters:
 Three characters in the 1897 novel The Well-Beloved by Thomas Hardy
 Avice, protagonist of the 2011 novel Embassytown by China Miéville

See also
 Avis (name)

Feminine given names